Kremena Kamenova (born  in Smolyan) is a Bulgarian female volleyball player. She is a member of the Bulgaria women's national volleyball team.

She was part of the Bulgarian national team at the 2014 FIVB Volleyball Women's World Championship in Italy.
She plays for Maritsa Plovdiv.

Clubs

References

External links
 Profile at CEV

1988 births
Living people
Bulgarian women's volleyball players
People from Pernik
Expatriate volleyball players in Azerbaijan
Expatriate volleyball players in Romania
Expatriate volleyball players in Russia
Expatriate volleyball players in Turkey
Expatriate volleyball players in Poland
Bulgarian expatriate sportspeople in Azerbaijan
Bulgarian expatriate sportspeople in Romania
Bulgarian expatriates in Russia
Bulgarian expatriate sportspeople in Turkey
Bulgarian expatriate sportspeople in Poland